Bosna (sometimes Bosner) is a spicy Austrian fast food dish, said to have originated in Salzburg. It is believed to have been invented in 1949 by a man named Zanko Todoroff. It is now popular all over western Austria and southern Bavaria.

It resembles a hot dog, consisting mainly of a Bratwurst sausage, onions and a blend of mustard and/or tomato ketchup and curry powder (Curry ketchup). Bosna is made with white bread and is usually grilled briefly before serving.

Variations 
Several variations of the dish exist:
 Kleine Bosna (small bosna), with only one sausage
 Große Bosna (large bosna), with two sausages
 Kafka (named after Franz Kafka, Käsekrainer Bosna), with a different sausage type; generally a sausage with a different meat, more spice and cheese

See also
List of sandwiches

References

Fast food
Austrian sausages
Salzburg
Sausage sandwiches